Top Banana is an environmentally-themed platform game produced by Hex and Psycore for the Acorn Archimedes in 1991 and ported to the Amiga and Atari ST in 1992. The chief artist and coder was Miles Visman, with supporting graphics and sound by Karel Dander, and supporting graphics by Sophie Smith, Robert Pepperell and Matt Black. Top Banana was released using recycled cardboard packaging, furthermore being advertised as being the 'first video game with recycled packaging'. Top Banana's plot is about trying to save the environment from pollution using love.

Top Banana is heavily influenced by techno and rave culture, and the game features a techno music video as an introduction. Reception for Top Banana was polarized; some reviewers praised the game's techno soundtrack and 'original' environmental plot, while others heavily criticized the game due to its 'repetitive' and 'difficult' gameplay and 'difficult to parse' graphics. The game's graphics and sound are left uncompressed, allowing the player to edit them, something that the README included alongside the game encourages.

Plot
"Our planet is under threat - not from slimy aliens or evil wizards but from direct consequences of our own greed and stupidity. Every moment sees further demolition of the rainforest, more leaking nuclear waste, land floods caused by melting ice caps and much needed food rotting in locked warehouses. Your task is to combat those forces which are worlds tilts into oblivion you must redress the balance through positive action. To aid you in this task you are invested with a great power - that power is Love. Use this power to repel the agents of destruction. By spreading Love your enemies will vanish, or even begin to help you. You will be able to stem the tide of flood, neutralise the acid rain and release the hoarded fruits of the World's produce for all to share. If you succeed then you will have proved your skill and courage in the material world. Consequently, you will be offered the opportunity to seek ultimate wisdom in the Mind-Scape and achieve the status of Top Banana."
- Top Banana Manual

Gameplay
Top Banana is a platformer with the goal of each level being to reach the top of the level. The heroine, KT, must travel through psychedelic levels while jumping across platforms and throwing lovehearts to convert planet-damaging enemies into energising fruit. The enemies include Corprats, Popstars, Chainsaws and Bulldozers. Much like Rainbow Islands, water that damages the player rises from the bottom of the level to motivate the player to ascend to the top of the level quickly. However, in Top Banana the water is not an instant kill, and instead deals 1 point of damage to the player, the water then resets to the bottom of the level, and continues to rise. The player has one life and can take 5 hits before dying; upon death all progress in the game is lost, and the player must start again from the beginning of the game. KT's health is depicted visually by her portrait in the lower left, and parts of it disappear as health is lost. Fruit that the player may collect throughout the game does not replenish health, and instead awards points, which have no tangible reward other than the player may place in the high score table if enough points are collected.

Enemies are defeated in one hit, except for bosses which take several, and stationary enemies such as skulls that cannot be defeated and must be avoided. Some enemies can move through platforms, and towards the player directly. Bosses in Top Banana include a digitized photo of a man's head surrounded by circling dollar signs, a mecha robot, a motorcycle police officer's helmet combined with a spider, and a convulsing knobbled multi-coloured sphere, referred to in the manual as the "psychesphere of Enlightenment".

Top Banana features bosses at the end of each stage; each stage has several levels, and have differing background graphics and enemies. To finish a level, a picture of a woman's head at the top of the level must be touched by the player, and stages with bosses are completed when the boss is defeated. Top Banana has four stages: the Rain Forest, the Metal-City, the Temple, and the Mind-Scape. The background graphics in each stage are randomly selected from a set of graphics matching the stage's theme; each time the level is loaded the graphics may differ, although platforms remain fixed in the same locations. Upon finishing a level, the game displays a phrase randomly selected from a list of phrases as the next level loads, including "Beware, Behave", "Recycle The Hype" and "Get Up Get Down". In later stages there are traps that if walked into, slow movement, reverses the game's controls, as well as inverts the colors of the level's graphics for several seconds. Upon taking damage, the player phases through the platforms they are on for several seconds, causing the player to lose progress. There are checkpoints in each level that, upon being reached, the player cannot fall through. Blue flowers in levels may be turned into moving platforms by shooting them.

As a copy-protection measure, the player is prompted to enter a word from a specific page and line in the manual upon starting the game.

Development
Many of Top Banana's sprites are taken from videos and television for use in the game, much in the same way audio may be sampled in music. Musician and Coldcut member Matt Black worked on Top Banana, and later members of the Hex multimedia group formed Hexstatic. Top Banana was playtested in the Netherlands. Top Banana cost 329 Swedish Kronor in 1992.

Top Banana's developer & publisher Hex is also known as Hardwire, a company specializing in computer graphics work for music videos. Hex spokesman Robert Pepperell stated in an article in a May 1991 issue of The One that Top Banana was developed because Hex believed "a computer game would be an interesting challenge", and because "Most games look rather sterile. We wanted to do something really different and positive. The technique of video sampling has never been used in a game before. Top Banana really looks and sounds completely different to any other computer game yet written." Matt Black was initially going to make a cameo appearance in Top Banana as a manic bongo player, but this is absent in the final game. The screenshot of Top Banana featured in The One's article is drastically visually different to that of the final game, with a differing artstyle, a top-down perspective as opposed to a 2D one, and depicts a performance hall with a piano, a location absent in the final game.

Reception

Several reviewers compare Top Banana to Rainbow Islands and criticize Top Banana's graphics.

The Atari ST version of Top Banana is featured in Stuart Ashen's (also known by his online presence as Ashens) 2017 book Attack of the Flickering Skeletons: More Terrible Old Games You've Probably Never Heard Of, particularly criticizing Top Banana's graphics, calling them "an utterly indecipherable, garbled mess" and that "the only reason you can actually pick out the enemies from the rest of the screen is because they move ... each area gets progressively uglier and more muddled." Ashens criticises the sound effects, calling them "irritating", and notes that playing the Atari ST version on anything but an Atari STe removes them, replacing them with stock sound chip effects, which Ashens expresses is a more 'tolerable' alternative. Ashens also criticises Top Banana's gameplay and its difficulty, calling it "semi-playable" and a "badly executed platformer". When discussing the other versions of the game, Ashens says while the original Acorn Archimedes version is better than the ports, it is still not a good game.

Amiga Power gave the Amiga version of Top Banana an overall score of 45%, starting their review by stating that "the last thing I wanted to have thrust at me was a game featuring psychedelic 'acid' graphics, a 'dance' soundtrack, a naive ecological plot, environmentally-friendly packaging and things that wobble the screen about when you walk into them."  Amiga Power criticises Top Banana's gameplay, plot, and graphics, comparing its gameplay to Rainbow Islands, stating that "Rainbow Islands does it all a hundred times better" and calls the traps that reverse the player's controls 'irritating', and the graphics "confusing" and that it's "impossible to see what's going on most of the time". Amiga Power also expresses that there 'isn't much to do', summarizing Top Banana's gameplay as "just collecting, shooting, and climbing."

German gaming magazine Amiga Joker gave Top Banana an overall score of 16%, beginning their review with the following: "Our beautiful Earth is in a miserable state: the rainforests are dying, the hole in the ozone gets bigger every day, the sea levels are rising uncontrollably, and environmentally friendly software also gets worse! The box is made of recycled cardboard, which makes it very environmentally friendly - but the platforming game inside is unfortunately everything but friendly. Although this game follows in the tradition of Captain Planet and the packaging states it is "as engrossing as Sonic and Mario", the reality is quite different: what you see on your screen will ruin your eyes, destroy your eardrums and kill every last nerve."

Amiga Joker continues their review by criticising its graphics and gameplay, saying that "it plays even more boring than we have described it here; moreover there may as well be nothing recognisable on the screen: [there are] disgusting, barely animated digital graphics in hideous colors." Amiga Joker furthermore expressed their disdain for the music, gameplay and sound effects, calling Top Banana "almost unplayable, wholeheartedly unoriginal and, thanks to idiotic sound effects and grinding title music, also acoustically unbearable ... Conclusion: picking up trash in the park is a more exciting and meaningful environment game [than Top Banana]." Amiga Joker's only compliment was the parallax scrolling, which they called "smooth", but expressed that it did not make up for the rest of the game's shortcomings.

German gaming magazine Aktueller Software Markt gave the Amiga version of Top Banana four out of twelve; the reviewer is a fan of Coldcut, and praised Top Banana's introductory music video ^, stating in regards to the game that "Such a first-class promotion will naturally bring lots of interest to the game - so what is concealed within Top Banana? The answer: a cheap version of hopscotch." ASM criticises Top Banana's gameplay and graphics, expressing that "Perhaps quite notable are the crazy techno sounds and the psychedelic graphics, which are best enjoyed with a pair of sunglasses. But other than that? More sparkle than sense!" ASM praised Top Banana's music, giving it a ten out of twelve.

Swedish gaming magazine Datormagazin gave the Amiga version of Top Banana an overall score of 75%, beginning their review by stating that "It's not easy to break new ground when it comes to platform games, but Top Banana attempts exactly this." Datormagazin expresses a desire for more problem solving in Top Banana, and further notes that the gameplay is 'par for the course' for platform games, comparing it to Rainbow Islands. Datormagazin praises Top Banana's unique graphics and music, praising the techno soundtrack and stating that "The backgrounds look like a middle ground between 'neat 70's style & a MTV video run off a modem', complete with music." Datormagazin however notes that "sometimes it can be difficult to distinguish between the background and things on screen that are important or dangerous ... [also] some enemies you cannot see because they're too small", furthermore calling the graphics "a bit messy at times." Datormagazin praises Top Banana's plot and meaning as "deep", and praises the ability to edit Top Banana's graphics, stating that it adds "longetivity" to what the player can get out of the game. Datormagazin concludes by calling Top Banana "not the best of the best", but that it has the 'spirit' of the original Rainbow Islands.

British Channel 4 television programme GamesMaster reviewed Top Banana in episode five of season one; the reviewers were contestants on the game show, and gave Top Banana an overall score of 65%. Top Banana was reviewed by three reviewers with differing opinions on the game; one reviewer praised Top Banana's "great" music and "absolutely superb" graphics, while simultaneously calling the game 'unplayable', while another praised its 'original' environmental plot, but summarized Top Banana as "just another platformer with a beat 'em up in the middle." Another reviewer stated that "I've seen it all before, really."

Legacy
A demo for Top Banana is featured on Amiga Format issue #32's coverdisk. In November 1992 the game was included in Hex's release Global Chaos CDTV on the then new CD-ROM medium, alongside remixes of Top Banana's soundtrack.

See also
 Hexstatic
 Rainbow Islands

References 

1991 video games
Acorn Archimedes games
Amiga games
Atari ST games
Music video games
Video games based on musicians
Platform games
Rave culture in the United Kingdom
Side-scrolling video games
Video games developed in the United Kingdom
Video games featuring female protagonists